Anthem of China may refer to:
"March of the Volunteers", the national anthem of China
"National Anthem of the Republic of China", the national anthem of Taiwan and of China until 1949
Military anthem of China
"National Flag Anthem of the Republic of China", used by Taiwan in place of a national anthem at some sporting events
Historical Chinese anthems